Taylor Jacob Moe (born October 14, 1990) is a former American football wide receiver.

He was signed by the New England Patriots as an undrafted free agent out of Missouri in 2013. He has also been a member of the St. Louis Rams.

After Moe tore his Achilles tendon during the Patriots' offseason training activities, the Patriots designated him as "waived/injured." He was released on March 10, 2014.

Moe signed with the St. Louis Rams on May 5, 2014, but was released in the first round of cuts.

Radio 
Moe is a cohost of The Hardline, a sports talk radio program on St. Louis based 590 The Fan KFNS (AM).

Moe is a frequent contributor to 'Fearless with Jason Whitlock' on Blaze Media.

References

External links
New England Patriots bio
Missouri Tigers bio

1989 births
Living people
People from O'Fallon, Missouri
Players of American football from Missouri
Sportspeople from Greater St. Louis
American football wide receivers
Missouri Tigers football players
New England Patriots players
St. Louis Rams players